Clymer may refer to:

Name
Clymer (surname)

Places

United States
Clymer, New York, a town in Chautauqua County
Clymer, Pennsylvania, a borough in Indiana County
Clymer Township, Tioga County, Pennsylvania

Publications
Clymer repair manual, repair manuals for various powersports machines